Jefferson County is a county located in the U.S. state of Idaho. As of the 2020 Census, the county's population was 30,891. In the 2010 census, the population was 26,140. The county seat and largest city is Rigby. The county was established in 1913 and named after Thomas Jefferson, the third U.S. President. Jefferson County is part of the Idaho Falls, ID Metropolitan Statistical Area.

Geography

History
The Salt Lake City to Virginia City Stagecoach was established through the area in 1864. Stops were established at Market Lake (Roberts), Sand Hole (Hamer), and Camas. Small settlements grew up around the stagecoach stops with the most significant development occurring at Market Lake. The county's first post office was established at Market Lake on July 29, 1868, when the post office at Eagle Rock was relocated there. Initial settlement at Mud Lake also originated in 1868.

The Utah and Northern Railway reached Camas on July 3, 1879, bringing with it a new wave of settlement, particularly at Camas and Market Lake. Mormon settlement of the county began when John R Poole settled the Menan area in April, 1879 with the settlement initially named Poole's Island. Settlement followed at Lewisville in 1882, Rigby in 1883 and Ririe in 1888. The Camas and Market Lake precincts are the first to emerge in census data under Bingham County in 1890. At that point, 379 residents were enumerated in the Camas precinct and Market Lake counted 218. By the 1900 census, precincts were added for Lewisville, Menan, Rigby, and Rudy (located between Ririe and Rigby). Together with Camas and Market Lake precincts, they contained a population of 3,046. By 1910 there were 10 precincts that would become part of Jefferson County three years later with additional precincts added for Grant, Hamer, Labelle, and Lorenzo. The 1910 census population for those precincts was 5,535.

A common characteristic of Jefferson County's early settlements was their reliance upon a series of canals to deliver water from the Snake River. The first of these systems commenced at Menan in 1880 with construction of the Long Island Canal. The Butte-Market Lake Canal originated in 1884 with construction starting on the big Feeder Canal in 1895. The Owlsey Canal in western Jefferson County had its origins April 13, 1909.

At the time of the first settlement in 1864, the territory east of the Snake River was part of Oneida County with the remainder being part of Alturas County. Mud Lake became the defining point for Oneida County's boundary with Alturas County in 1877 with a portion of the western boundary changed to a line drawn north from a point on the Snake River due south of the "sink of Camas Creek". The change transferred settlements at Camas and Market Lake to Oneida County. Bingham County was created in 1885 from Oneida County with no change in the boundary of Alturas until 1889 when the rest of the Mud Lake area was transferred to Bingham County. All of present Jefferson County became part of Fremont at its creation in 1893. After its creation in 1913, Jefferson County quickly took its present shape in 1917 at the formation of Butte County.

Census data indicates Lewisville became the county's first incorporated village in 1904. It was followed by Rigby in 1906, Menan in 1907 and Roberts in 1910. Ririe was incorporated by 1920 with Hamer and Mud Lake incorporated after 1950.

Adjacent counties
 Clark County - north
 Fremont County - northeast
 Madison County - east
 Bonneville County - south
 Bingham County - southwest
 Butte County - west

Major highways
 Interstate 15
 US 20
 SH-22
 SH-28
 SH-33
 SH-48

National protected area
 Camas National Wildlife Refuge
 Targhee National Forest (part)

Demographics

2000 census
As of the census of 2000, there were 19,155 people, 5,901 households, and 4,880 families living in the county. The population density was 18 people per square mile (7/km2). There were 6,287 housing units at an average density of 6 per square mile (2/km2). The racial makeup of the county was 90.87% White, 0.28% Black or African American, 0.46% Native American, 0.23% Asian, 0.08% Pacific Islander, 6.76% from other races, and 1.33% from two or more races. 9.96% of the population were Hispanic or Latino of any race. 32.7 were of English, 10.9% German and 9.2% American ancestry.

There were 5,901 households, out of which 47.60% had children under the age of 18 living with them, 72.60% were married couples living together, 6.80% had a female householder with no husband present, and 17.30% were non-families. 15.20% of all households were made up of individuals, and 7.40% had someone living alone who was 65 years of age or older. The average household size was 3.23 and the average family size was 3.62.

In the county, the population was spread out, with 36.30% under the age of 18, 9.60% from 18 to 24, 25.50% from 25 to 44, 19.30% from 45 to 64, and 9.30% who were 65 years of age or older. The median age was 29 years. For every 100 females there were 102.20 males. For every 100 females age 18 and over, there were 101.00 males.

The median income for a household in the county was $37,737, and the median income for a family was $41,530. Males had a median income of $31,298 versus $19,755 for females. The per capita income for the county was $13,838. About 8.00% of families and 10.40% of the population were below the poverty line, including 13.00% of those under age 18 and 8.70% of those age 65 or over.

2010 census
As of the 2010 United States Census, there were 26,140 people, 8,146 households, and 6,698 families living in the county. The racial makeup of the county was 91.2% white, 0.8% American Indian, 0.4% Asian, 0.2% black or African American, 0.1% Pacific islander, 5.8% from other races, and 1.5% from two or more races. Those of Hispanic or Latino origin made up 10.1% of the population. In terms of ancestry, 31.4% were English, 13.9% were German, 8.2% were American, 5.9% were Danish, and 5.3% were Irish.

Of the 8,146 households, 47.7% had children under the age of 18 living with them, 70.6% were married couples living together, 7.4% had a female householder with no husband present, 17.8% were non-families, and 15.0% of all households were made up of individuals. The average household size was 3.20 and the average family size was 3.57. The median age was 30.0 years.

The median income for a household in the county was $51,579 and the median income for a family was $55,705. Males had a median income of $42,177 versus $27,314 for females. The per capita income for the county was $19,019. About 7.7% of families and 10.2% of the population were below the poverty line, including 11.7% of those under age 18 and 9.0% of those age 65 or over.

Politics
Jefferson County is an overwhelmingly Republican and conservative county. The last Democrat who carried the county in a presidential election was Harry S. Truman in 1948. In 2012 President Obama received just 11.4 percent of the vote. In the 1972 Presidential election Richard Nixon won the county with then John Birch Society member John G. Schmitz reportedly receiving 27.51 percent of the county's vote. The last Democratic candidate to receive more than twenty percent of the county's vote was Jimmy Carter in 1976.

Communities

Cities
Hamer
Lewisville
Menan
Mud Lake
Rigby
Ririe
Roberts

Unincorporated communities
Grant
Heise
Monteview
Terreton
LaBelle

Notable people
 Earl W. Bascom, rodeo pioneer, inventor, actor, cowboy artist, inductee of the Idaho Rodeo Hall of Fame.
 Philo Farnsworth, American inventor and television pioneer.
 Pat Friday, American singer.

See also
National Register of Historic Places listings in Jefferson County, Idaho

References

External links

 

 
Idaho counties
1913 establishments in Idaho
Populated places established in 1913
Idaho Falls metropolitan area counties